Polestar is a Swedish automotive brand established in 1996 by Volvo Cars' partner Flash/Polestar Racing and acquired in 2015 by Volvo, which itself was acquired by Geely in 2010. It is headquartered in Torslanda outside Gothenburg, Sweden with vehicle production taking place in China.

The Polestar name originates from the STCC Polestar racing team which spawned Polestar Performance AB, in turn acquired by Volvo Cars in July 2015. The racing team changed its name to Cyan Racing, while maintaining close ties to Volvo.

In September 2021, Polestar announced an intention to go public through a business combination agreement with Gores Guggenheim, Inc., a special-purpose acquisition company. Polestar shares began trading on the Nasdaq exchange under the symbol PSNY on 24 June 2022.

History 
The company origins can be traced back to the foundation of Flash Engineering in 1996, a Swedish racing team competing in Swedish Touring Car Championship (STCC). The team was later sold and rebranded to Polestar Racing, starting to engineer their own racing Volvos in the late 2000s. In 2009 the brand became the official Volvo partner to modify existing models, under the brand Polestar Performance. Volvo eventually bought the company and brand in July 2015, offering Polestar enhanced models directly from their resellers.

The Volvo S60 Polestar Concept is the heir to the C30 Polestar, featuring 508 BHP from a modified T6 engine, launched in June 2012. Motor Trend tested the car at Mazda Raceway Laguna Seca where it broke the lap record for four-door cars, matching the lap time of an Audi R8.

Selection of petrol and hybrid powered Polestar models:

In October 2017, Volvo Cars and Geely Holding announced that the Polestar would become a standalone brand focusing on electric cars.

Products

Production cars 

Polestar has produced two electric performance cars. The first was Polestar 1, a luxurious 2+2 coupé inspired by Volvo's Concept Coupé introduced in 2013, which includes influences from the Volvo P1800. The Polestar 1 was introduced on 17 October 2017, and was built between 2019 and 2021. The Polestar 1 was built in a new purpose-built Polestar Production Centre in Chengdu, China, from 2019 at a rate of up to 500 per year. During its final year of production, a limited-production gold-painted version of Polestar 1 was released. Only 25 units were produced.

In 2019, Polestar announced their second car, the Polestar 2 electric car. It was unveiled on 27 February 2019, in an online unveiling which was broadcast from the Polestar headquarters in Gothenburg, Sweden. Directly after, it had its public debut at the 2019 Geneva Motor Show. It is produced at Volvo Cars's existing plant in Taizhou, China. It will be receiving a mid-life refresh for its 2024 year-model, switching to a rear-wheel drive layout for its single-motor option, and various performance and cosmetic changes for the base model and performance package, respectively. It will also replace the existing front grille with a body-color front-end treatment that houses new safety hardware, including a front-facing camera and a new mid-range radar, matching the Polestar 3, dubbed the "SmartZone".

Performance optimisation 
Under the label Polestar Engineered, Polestar offers enhancements for Volvo cars which deliver better performance. Examples are engine optimizations with retained warranty and unchanged fuel consumption and emissions. The engine optimization increases the power and torque output, varying depending on engine model. The response of the throttle can be modified and the character of the transmission is tweaked.

In 2022, a special version of Polestar 2 was released as a Polestar Engineered product: the limited-production Polestar 2 BST edition 270, of which only 270 will exist.

Upcoming cars 

The marque has announced new models debuting starting in 2022. This entails the introduction of the Polestar 3, followed by the 4 and 5 in the following years. On 25 February 2020, Polestar unveiled the Precept concept car. It was expected to debut at the 2020 Geneva Motor Show, however the event was cancelled due to the COVID-19 pandemic. It is expected to be launched in 2024 as the Polestar 5. 

In March 2022, Polestar launched a roadster concept named the Polestar O2, and later in August 2022, Polestar announced a sixth new roadster model dubbed Polestar 6 based on the O2 concept car, expected to enter production in 2026.

Racing 
Polestar has been working with Volvo since 1996, starting with racing Volvo cars and being involved in the development of race cars for Cyan Racing. In 2014, Polestar was involved in the development of a V8 powered Volvo S60 that was raced by Garry Rogers Motorsport in the Australian V8 Supercars series. Robert Dahlgren was seconded to Australia in 2014 as part of this programme and pulled out in the end of 2016.

Logo dispute and ban in France 
The French Citroën company considered that the Polestar company logo – also formed of chevrons – is too close to those of its Citroën and DS Automobiles brands. In the absence of an amicable agreement, Citroën took to the Tribunal de grande instance in July 2019. The latter, in a decision dated 4 June 2020, found in favor of the French manufacturer, decision confirmed on appeal on 14 June 2020. December 2021. As a result, Polestar vehicles cannot be purchased in France. In September 2022, it was reported that Citroën and Polestar had settled their dispute.

Other ventures 
In August 2022, the company announced it would supply batteries to Candela for electric boats that would 'fly' on hydrofoils.

See also 
 Audi e-tron
 Mercedes-Benz EQ
 BMW i
 Jaguar I-Pace
 Porsche Taycan
 Tesla Inc.

References

External links 
 

Vehicle manufacturing companies established in 1996
Swedish companies established in 1996
Volvo Cars
Geely divisions and subsidiaries
Luxury motor vehicle manufacturers
Manufacturing companies based in Gothenburg
Electric vehicle manufacturers of Sweden
Swedish brands
Car brands
Battery electric vehicle manufacturers
Companies listed on the Nasdaq
Special-purpose acquisition companies